Highway 10 (VI 10) is a road on St. John in the U.S. Virgin Islands. Usually referred to as Center Line Road by locals, as it runs through the center of the island, Highway 10 runs from Highway 20 in Cruz Bay across St. John, entering Virgin Islands National Park along the way. Route 10 has three auxiliary routes, Highway 104, Highway 107, and Highway 108.

Route description 
The route begins at U.S. Virgin Islands Highway 20 in Cruz Bay. From there, it enter several suburbs and enters Virgin Islands National Park, where the surrounding land is green grass. The route then meets U.S. Virgin Islands Highway 104 along Centerline Road and exits the park. Nearing Coral Harbor, it skims a small shoreline community before reentering the park, ending at a dead end near Round Bay.

Major intersections

Auxiliary routes

Highway 104

Highway 104 (Southside Road ) is a road on St. John, USVI. It runs from Highway 10 in Cruz Bay back to Highway 10 inside Virgin Islands National Park. The road serves several resorts on the island's southern shore, most notably the Westin St. John.

Highway 107

Highway 107 is a road on St. John, USVI. Its northern terminus is near the town of Coral Bay. The road runs almost five miles (making it the longest auxiliary route on the island) from Highway 10 to the southern shores of St. John. Highway 107 serves several towns along the shores of Coral Bay. The paved road ends (and thus loses its number) just inside Virgin Islands National Park; an unpaved road continues about a mile before ending at a trailhead.

Highway 108

Highway 108 is a short road in St. John, USVI. The road is made up of two paved sections, connected by one unpaved one. The western paved section runs south from Highway 10 to the town of Bordeaux and is one mile (1.6 km) long. The eastern section sets out west from Highway 107 to the end of pavement six-tenths of a mile later. The road serves several residences on the southern part of St. John.

References

10